Clifford Alexander Aberson (August 28, 1921 – June 23, 1973) was a Major League Baseball left fielder and American football player. Aberson played baseball for the Chicago Cubs for parts of three seasons, from 1947 to 1949. He hit .251 in 63 career games. He also played football for the Green Bay Packers, playing 10 games in 1946.

Personal life
Aberson enlisted in the United States Army Air Forces in 1943. He was transferred to the United States Army by 1945, and took part in the European theatre as a sergeant. He was discharged in March 1946.

References

External links

1921 births
1973 deaths
Major League Baseball left fielders
Chicago Cubs players
Players of American football from Chicago
American football running backs
Green Bay Packers players
United States Army personnel of World War II
United States Army Air Forces personnel of World War II
Janesville Cubs players
Des Moines Bruins players
Tulsa Oilers (baseball) players
Los Angeles Angels (minor league) players
Mobile Bears players
Hollywood Stars players
St. Paul Saints (AA) players
Pueblo Dodgers players
Baseball players from Illinois
United States Army non-commissioned officers
United States Army Air Forces soldiers